Barim (also Romanized as Barīm and Borīm; also known as Barīm-e Nakha‘ī, Barim Nakha’ī, Beyram, and Beyrīm) is a village in Heruz Rural District, Kuhsaran District, Ravar County, Kerman Province, Iran. At the 2006 census, its population was 59, in 13 families.

References 

Populated places in Ravar County